Diana Bovio (born 12 March 1989) is a Mexican actress known in her native country for her roles in Mexican films. Bovio began her career as an actress in stage in her native country in productions such as Los Bonobos, Verdad o reto and Forever Young, Never Alone. Her first starring role was in 2016 in the Mexican horror film 1974: La posesión de Altair. The independent film had great acceptance by specialized critics and won several awards for its passage through international festivals, and Diana getting the nominations for Best Actress for a Canacine Award, and for Best Actress in an Ibero-American film in the Fantaspoa International Film Festival.

Filmography

References

External links 
 

1989 births
Living people
Mexican film actresses
Mexican television actresses
21st-century Mexican actresses
Actresses from Monterrey
Actresses from Nuevo León
Mexican people of Italian descent